Supernatural Fairy Tales: The Progressive Rock Era is a 5-CD compilation of progressive rock from around the world.  It was curated by Archie Patterson of Eurock, and released by Rhino Records in 1996.  The cover art is by Roger Dean, longtime cover artist for the genre.

Reviews of the set generally note the difficulty of summarizing such a broad and far-reaching genre, as well as the obvious omission of several big-name bands whose music could not be licensed for inclusion.  However, several lesser-known tracks from a broad variety of bands make the set an interesting listen.

Contents

Disc 1
America - The Nice
Paper Sun - Traffic
Repent Walpurgis - Procol Harum
Private Sorrow/Balloon Burning - The Pretty Things
Legend Of A Mind - The Moody Blues
Kings & Queens - Renaissance
Sympathy - Rare Bird
Under The Sky - Pete Sinfield
Searching - Klaus Schulze
Sunrise - Kingdom Come

Disc 2
The System/Babylon - Aphrodite's Child
Death Walks Behind You - Atomic Rooster
Der Vierte Kuss - Ash Ra Tempel
Killer - Van der Graaf Generator
Oh Yeah - Can
Knife-Edge - Emerson, Lake & Palmer
In The Land Of Grey And Pink - Caravan
It Happened Today - Curved Air
Hocus Pocus - Focus
Prophet/Marvelry Skimmer - Wigwam

Disc 3
Perpetual Change - Yes
Lothlorien - Argent
Ladytron - Roxy Music
Radio - Supersister
Dear Little Mother - Savage Rose
The Musical Box - Genesis
Roll Over Beethoven - Electric Light Orchestra
New World - Strawbs
Celebration - Premiata Forneria Marconi
Karn Evil 9: 1st Impression, Parts 1 & 2 - Emerson, Lake & Palmer

Disc 4
Dancing With The Moonlit Knight - Genesis
Siberian Khatru - Yes
Virginia Plain - Roxy Music
Warrior - Wishbone Ash
Warinobaril - Lard Free
Mozambique - Amon Düül II
Round And Round - Strawbs 	
Questions And Answers - Nektar
Fils De Lumiere - Ange
Ritorno Al Nulla - Le Orme
Without Words - Clearlight

Disc 5
Star Palace Of The Sombre Warrior - Seventh Wave
Perfect Mystery - Gong
Free Hand - Gentle Giant
War - Henry Cow/Slapp Happy
Andra Satsen - Samla Mammas Manna
Let's Eat (Real Soon) - Hatfield and the North
Traccia II - Banco
Troller Tanz (Ghost Dance) - Magma
It's A Rainy Day, Sunshine Girl - Faust
Mummy Was An Asteroid, Daddy Was A Small Non-Stick Kitchen Utensil - Quiet Sun
Radar Love - Golden Earring
Inca Roads - Frank Zappa & The Mothers of Invention

Albums with cover art by Roger Dean (artist)
1996 compilation albums
Progressive rock compilation albums
Rhino Records compilation albums